Johnstons of Elgin is a woollen mill in Elgin, Scotland.

Alexander Johnston established his business in 1797 at Newmill Elgin on the banks of the River Lossie. Despite a major fire (1954) and numerous floods the Mill at Elgin continues to produce the finest woollen garments including cashmere. The original mill produced linen, flax, oatmeal and tobacco but Alexander Johnston, introduced textiles and phased out the original products. He pioneered the use of tweed for camouflage and the style became known as Scottish Estate Tweeds. Johnstons at their Elgin mill carries out the processes of dyeing, spinning, weaving and finishing on one site, thus making it the only vertical mill in Scotland.

Johnstons of Elgin is the UK’s largest producer of luxury cashmere and fine woollens,  The mill uses cashmere from China and Mongolia and lambswool from Australia.

The company has seven retail locations in the United Kingdom (London, Gretna Green, Hawick, Kildare, Edinburgh, St Andrews and at the original Elgin mill).

Johnstons of Elgin was granted with the Royal Warrant of Appointment to the Duke of Rothesay, as manufacturers of Estate Tweed woollen fabric in 2013.

In 2021 the company featured in ITV4’s Made in Britain documentary series.

References

Clothing companies of Scotland
Privately held companies of Scotland
Knitwear manufacturers
Wholesalers of the United Kingdom
Cashmere wool
Scottish brands
1797 establishments in Scotland
British companies established in 1797